The Ūawa River is a river in the Gisborne Region of New Zealand. The river drains an area of consisting of predominately managed forestry land northwest of Tolaga Bay. The river flows out into the Pacific at Tolaga Bay. The river is prone to flooding and has had significant issues with forestry slash.

Course
The ultimate source of the river is at the head of the Pangopango Stream near Tauwharepārae. The stream initially flows north and where it is joined by Ngapunarua Stream it becomes the upper section of the river, the Waiau River. The river meanders in a northerly direction through large areas of managed forestry before bending eastwards towards the settlement of Hikuwai.

The middle section of the river is known as the Hikuwai River. This section begins at the confluence of the Waiau River and the Mangarākai Stream. The river flow south through this section, meandering through an area of farmland and the settlements of Arero and Mangatuna. State highway 2 follows the river valley through this section crossing the river four times.

The lower section begins at the confluence of the Mangatokerau and the Hikuwai River. The river and meanders south for about  passing the settlement of Wharekaka before flowing into the sea at Tolaga Bay.

Flooding

The catchment area of the river is prone to high rain falls when easterly weather systems make landfall from the Pacific Ocean.

See also
List of rivers of New Zealand

References

Rivers of the Gisborne District
Rivers of New Zealand